The 2013 Victorian Premier League was the one-hundred first season of the top tier of club football in Victoria. The home and away season commenced on 6 April 2013. Dandenong Thunder were the defending champions.

Match-fixing scandal
On 15 September 2013, Victoria Police arrested ten people at the Southern Stars, including players David Obaze, Nick McKoy and Joe Woolley, and head coach Zaya Younan. 

Later in September, criminal charges were laid by the Victoria Police: the FFA handed Noel, Woolley, Obaze, McKoy and coach Younan initial suspensions which prevented them from being involved in any football-related activity in Australia while the investigation was ongoing. Those bans were also extended worldwide by FIFA. Two British footballers, Reiss Noel and Joe Woolley, received lifetime bans from FIFA for their role in the incident.

Gerry Subramaniam, a Malaysian national and the Australian ring-leader of the betting syndicate behind the match fixing, was sentenced to three years jail in Australia, to be followed by deportation to Malaysia.

The Southern Stars were later suspended from the competition, and all 22 of their matches were declared a No Result, being recorded as 0–0 draws with zero points awarded: this ruling effectively deleted the club from the calculations of the final ladder.

However, the Bentleigh Greens had  originally forfeited their Round 22 match against Southern Stars due to a lack of players: as a result of the above ruling, Bentleigh were awarded one point for the match and had a previously imposed fine of $900 for the forfeit refunded.

VPL Teams

Promotion and relegation 

Teams promoted from Victorian State League Division 1:
(After the end of the 2012 season.)

 Pascoe Vale (champions)
 Port Melbourne (runners-up)

Teams relegated to Victorian State League Division 1:
(After the end of the 2012 season.)

 Moreland Zebras (11th)
 Heidelberg United (12th)

Regular season
The Victorian Premier League 2012 season was played over 22 rounds, beginning on 23 March and concluding on 16 September 2012, followed by the final series.

Finals

Finals Week 1

Finals Week 2

Finals Week 3

Grand Final

Top goalscorers

See also
Victorian Premier League
Football Federation Victoria

References

Victorian Premier League seasons
Victorian Premier League, 2013
2013 domestic association football leagues